Diving was contested at the 2013 Summer Universiade from July 5 to 12 at the Aquatics Palace in Kazan, Russia.

Medal summary

Medal table

Men's events

Women's events

References

External links
2013 Summer Universiade – Diving
Results book

2013 in diving
2013 Summer Universiade events
Diving at the Summer Universiade